Golden Eagle is a 1946 historical play by the British writer Clifford Bax. It portrays the reign of Mary, Queen of Scots.

It ran for 39 performances at the Westminster Theatre in London's West End between 29 January and 2 March 1946. The original cast featured Claire Luce as Queen Mary and also included Arthur Wontner, David Horne and Torin Thatcher. It was produced and directed by Anmer Hall. The play's music was composed by the author's brother Arnold Bax with whom he often collaborated.

References

Bibliography
 Wearing, J.P. The London Stage 1940-1949: A Calendar of Productions, Performers, and Personnel.  Rowman & Littlefield,  2014.

1946 plays
West End plays
Biographical plays
Plays set in Scotland
Plays set in the 16th century
Plays about Scottish royalty
Cultural depictions of Mary, Queen of Scots
Plays by Clifford Bax